HMS A4 was an early Royal Navy submarine.

She was a member of the first British  of submarines. Like all her class, she was built at Vickers, Barrow-in-Furness.

Service history
A4 suffered a serious accident, although without casualties, on 16 October 1905 during an underwater signalling experiment off Spithead.

A bell had been lowered into the water from a dinghy some distance away from the submarine was being used to signal to the submarine, which was running awash.  A flag on a boat hook protruding through a ventilator which had been left open was used to indicate that the signal had been heard.  The experiment had been performed successfully on the previous day, but the sea was much rougher on 16 October and consequently the submarine stayed inside the breakwater.

The same trim settings had been used as on the previous day, but as there was fresh water flowing into the harbour, the water was less dense and so the submarine was less buoyant than on the previous day.

The crew managed to blow the ballast tanks to surface the boat and evacuate onto the deck, but there was an explosion whilst she was being towed back to port and she slowly sank. The boat was salvaged and repaired. The captain of the submarine at the time, Lieutenant Martin Nasmith, was later awarded the Victoria Cross for his command of  during the Dardanelles campaign in 1915.

During the First World War she was used for training at Portsmouth, and was sold for scrap on 16 January 1920.

References

 Royal Navy Submarine museum

External links
 MaritimeQuest HMS A-4 Pages

 

A-class submarines (1903)
World War I submarines of the United Kingdom
British submarine accidents
Ships built in Barrow-in-Furness
Royal Navy ship names
1903 ships